Diego Suárez Hernández (born 10 October 1994) is a Spanish footballer who plays for CD Tudelano as a forward.

Club career
Born in Zaragoza, Aragon, Suárez graduated from local Real Zaragoza's youth system. He made his senior debuts with the reserves in the 2011–12 campaign, in Segunda División B.

On 2 November 2013 Suárez made his debut with the main squad, replacing Barkero in a 2–3 loss at SD Eibar in the Segunda División championship. On 16 July 2015 he signed a new two-year contract with the club, being loaned to Lleida Esportiu in a season-long deal.

References

External links

1994 births
Living people
Footballers from Zaragoza
Spanish footballers
Association football forwards
Segunda División players
Segunda División B players
Tercera División players
Real Zaragoza B players
Real Zaragoza players
Lleida Esportiu footballers
Burgos CF footballers
CD Guijuelo footballers
SD Ejea players
CD Tudelano footballers